The Polizia Postale e delle Comunicazioni (Postal and Communications Police) is one of the units of the Polizia di Stato, the State Police of Italy. Its functions include the investigation of cybercrime.

History 
PolTel has been created in 1981 as a special department of the Polizia di Stato in order to ensure safety, prevention and the repression of crimes on the field of the Italian Ministry of mail and telecommunications. Initially, it oversaw postal offices and protected armoured trucks during operations of valuables transport. The personnel was active in vigilance services for money and valuables transport operated by Ferrovie dello Stato Italiane, along with the railroad police (Polfer). After a privatization process in Italy and the foundation of Poste Italiane S.p.A. in 1998, the police service has been renamed in "Polizia Postale e delle Comunicazioni".

Following the reform of the public security administration, the Postal and Communications Police has become a cutting-edge "special division" of the State Police against cybercrimes, respecting the constitutional values of privacy and freedom.

Organization 
The interministerial decree issued on 19 January 1999 describes the postal police as the "central body of the Ministry of the Interior for its security and the telecommunications services regularity":

 The postal and communications police service, with its headquarters in Rome, co-ordinates 20 divisions located in every regional capital city (e.g., Milan, Florence, Naples, etc.), except for the Aosta Valley which belongs to Turin's department. Sicily is divided in two departments with their headquarters located in Palermo (Sicilia Occidentale) and Catania (Sicilia Orientale)
The departments have regional competence and generally they are directed by a First executive of the State Police. Departments coordinate in turn the sections inside their territory
 There are 76 sections of PolTel and each of them has provincial competence, under the direction of Inspectors.

Tasks 
PolTel represents the branch of the Italian Police specialized in prevention, control and repression of all the penal and administrative crimes belonging to the communication field, criminal activities on the internet and cybercrime in general. According to the law, it has an exclusive on struggling against online child pornography. PolTel operates closely with the Autorità per le garanzie nelle comunicazioni (AGCOM) and the regional communication inspectorates of the Ministry of Economic Development. PolTel has signed agreements with agencies and companies as Poste Italiane, Associazione Bancaria Italiana, GSE S.p.A. (Gestore dei servizi energetici), Ferrovie dello Stato, hospitals, etc.

PolTel performs judicial investigation for all the cybercrimes added by time into the Italian penal code, and for all crimes committed through more recent IT. Judicial police activity is not exclusively a web-intelligence one (monitoring chat lines, newsgroup, social network, etc), but it is also competent in: hacking (intrusions, computer damages), telephony (fixed and mobile, VoIP), privacy, eventually author's rights and copyright (videos, music, pay-tv), e-commerce, surveillance over radio and TV frequencies, frauds related to home banking, political subversion, terrorism, illegal trades of drugs, weapons and explosives, or every traditional crime that have a computer as a target or medium.

High competence on cybercrimes 
Ministry of Interior's decree issued on 28 April 2006 says that:

Competences of every Police force, including PolTel, has been revised by the Minniti Decree of 15 August 2017, which defines:

PolTel is also engaging in investigations to prevent and counteract copyright violations which can be performed online, cooperating with other Italian Police forces and in particular with Guardia di Finanza according to the art. 2, paragraph 2, letter l of the legislative decree n. 68 of 2001. The special Police department guarantees also the general integrity and functionality of the computer network, including the protection of critical infrastructures managed with IT systems and of all national strategic assets. PolTel controls the security and regularity of the telecommunication services and contrasts online child pornography, according to the art. 7-bis of the decree-law n. 144 of 27 July 2005 converted with modifications by law n. 155 of 31 July 2005, where are described the tasks of the Centro nazionale anticrimine informatico per la protezione delle infrastrutture critiche (CNAIPIC), and according to art. 19 of law n. 38 of 6 February 2006, n. 38.

See also
 Polizia di Stato

References

External links
 Official website

Polizia di Stato
Postal police
Postal system of Italy